The golden-naped finch (Pyrrhoplectes epauletta) is a species of finch in the family Fringillidae. It is in monotypic genus Pyrrhoplectes.

It is found in Bhutan, China, India, Myanmar, and Nepal. Its natural habitat is temperate forest.

Gallery

References

golden-naped finch
Birds of Bhutan
Birds of the Himalayas
Birds of Nepal
Birds of Yunnan
golden-naped finch
Taxonomy articles created by Polbot